Fabbri is an Italian surname. Notable people with the name include:
 Adriana Bisi Fabbri (1881–1918), Italian painter
 Agenore Fabbri (1911–1998), Italian sculptor and painter
 Alan Fabbri (born 1979), Italian politician
 Alejandro Fabbri (born 1982), Argentine tennis player
 Alessandro Fabbri (1877–1922), commander of the Otter Cliffs Radio Station
 Alessandro Fabbri (footballer) (born 1990), Italian footballer
 Alex Fabbri (born 1998), Sammarinese motorcycle racer
 Alicia Fabbri (born 2003), Candian ice dancer
 Andrea Fabbri (born 1992), Italian ice dancer
 Camila Fabbri (born 1989), Argentine writer, playwright and actress
 Cora Fabbri (1871–1892), American poet
 Daniele Fabbri or Daniele Luttazzi (born 1961), Italian comedian, writer, satirist, illustrator and singer/songwriter
 Davidé Fabbri, Italian comic book artist
 Diego Fabbri (1911–1980), Italian playwright
 Edda Fabbri (born 1949), Uruguayan writer
 Edmondo Fabbri (1921–1995), Italian footballer and coach
 Erik Fabbri (born 1991), Italian footballer
 Fabio Fabbri (born 1933), Italian minister of defence, 1993–94
 Fabrizio Fabbri (194 –2019), Italian cyclist
 Filippo Fabbri (born 2002), Sammarinese footballer
 Flora Fabbri, 19th century ballet dancer
 Franco Fabbri (born 1949), Brazilian-born Italian musician, musicologist and broadcaster
 Gianmarco Fabbri (born 1997), Italian football player
 Giovan Battista Fabbri (1926–2015), Italian football player and manager
 Inez Fabbri (1831–1909), Austro-American opera singer and impresaria
 Jacques Fabbri (1925–1997), French actor
 Lea Fabbri (born 1985), Croatian basketball player
 Leonardo Fabbri (born 1997), Italian shot putter
 Luce Fabbri (1908–2000), Italian anarchist writer and publisher, daughter of Luigi 
 Lucio Fabbri (born 1955), Italian musician, conductor and composer 
 Luigi Fabbri (1877–1935), Italian anarchist, writer, agitator and propagandist
 Marcello Fabbri (1923–2015), Italian poet
 Marco Fabbri (born 1988), Italian ice dancer
 Michael Fabbri, English stand-up comedian
 Nello Fabbri (1934–2020), Italian cyclist
 Nelson Delle-Vigne Fabbri (born 1949), Italian classical pianist and educator
 Néstor Fabbri (born 1968), Argentine footballer
 Paolo Fabbri (born 1948), Italian musicologist
 Paolo Fabbri (1939–2020), Italian semiotician and professor
 Pasquale Fabbri (born 1942), Italian cyclist
 Robby Fabbri (born 1996), Canadian ice hockey player
 Roberto Fabbri (born 1964), Italian guitarist
 Thomas Fabbri (born 1991), Italian footballer
 Tricia Fabbri, American basketball coach
 Ulderico Fabbri (1897–1970), Italian sculptor

Fictitious 

 Lorenzo Fabbri, fictional character from police drama television series Inspector Rex

See also 

 Fabre
 Fabri
 Fabry

Surnames of Italian origin